For lists of Portugal national football team results every twenty years see:
 Portugal national football team results (1921–39)
 Portugal national football team results (1940–59)
 Portugal national football team results (1960–79)
 Portugal national football team results (1980–99)
 Portugal national football team results (2000–19)
 Portugal national football team results (2020–present)

External links 

Portugal: Fixtures and Results - FIFA.com